Jatt Pardesi is a Punjabi film directed by Jaspreet singh Attorney & Pawandeep Kumar, Produced by Jaspreet singh Attorney.

Cast
 Ballu Singh
 Aman Jay
 Mala Sethi
 Mannu Sandhu
 Davinder hothi
 Dharmendra
 Jaspreet singh Attorney
 Binnu Dhillon
 K. S. Makhan
 Aman Dhaliwal
 Surinder Shinda
 Bob Khehra
 Satpreet Singh
 Baljiwan Dhaliwal
 Darshan Kehal
 Mike Soldier
 Nancy French
 Scott Free
 Sarah Rose Butler
 Katrina Sherwood
 Aaron Wimmer
 Thomas Appley
 Vinay Vohra
 Shabba Thiara
 Malkiat Singh Rauni
 HS Bhajan
 Davinder Singh Pammi

Crew

Directors

 Jaspreet Singh Attorney
 Pawandeep Kumar
 Hamza Raza

Producers

 Jaspreet Singh Attorney at Law USA
 Sarabjit Singh Kang USA
 Sarbjit Singh Thiara USA

Music Directors

 Surinder Shinda
 Laddi Dhaliwal
 Harnek Virdi
 Dilkhush Thind
 Sarang Ahuja

Story and Screen Play

 Jaspreet Singh Attorney

Cinematography

 Sukhdeep Singh USA

Lyrics and Songs Written By

 Jaspreet singh Attorney
 Mohan Bansianwala
 Pargat Singh

Singers

 KS Makhan
 Kamal Khan
 Surinder Shinda
 Harjit Harman
 Renu Bala

Dialogues

 Jaspreet singh Attorney
 Shabdeesh Kumar

References

External links
 Jatt Pardesi Official Facebook

2015 films
Punjabi-language Indian films
2010s Punjabi-language films